The Quirónsalud Miguel Domínguez Hospital is a private general hospital located in the city of Pontevedra (Spain), managed by the Quirónsalud Hospital Group. It is located in the heart of the city centre.

History 
It was founded in 1947 as a clinic by the Asturian traumatologist surgeon Miguel Domínguez Rodríguez in Joaquín Costa Street. Originally, the hospital was 90% dedicated to traumatology, but it gradually became more professional and expanded its specialities until it became a general hospital. It operated as a family business from the inauguration of the clinic on 16 July 1949 until 1996, when the most important extension was carried out, with the construction of the section corresponding to Castelao Street.

It became a hospital in 2000. It was reopened as such on 1 February 2000, in the presence of the President of the Xunta de Galicia. In 2009, it became the Miguel Domínguez Hospital Group after the merger of three private institutions: the Miguel Domínguez Hospital, the Miguel Domínguez Polyclinic and the La Merced Medical Clinic. In 2011, it incorporated the Rehabilitation and Physiotherapy Centre in San Pedro de Alcántara Street into the hospital group.

On 16 October 2015, the private hospital group Quirónsalud bought the main hospital in the city centre from the Domínguez family, as well as the polyclinic specialities centre in Castelao Street, the rehabilitation and physiotherapy centre in San Pedro de Alcántara Street and the La Merced clinic in Andurique (Poio), very close to the city, which became the Neurorehabilitation Institute.

Description 
The Pontevedra Quirón Hospital has two entrances, one on Frei Xoán de Navarrete Street (main entrance) and one on Castelao Street, where the emergency and clinical analysis services are located. It has more than 50 specialist doctors, 5 operating theatres and advanced testing and diagnostic technologies. It also has other facilities such as an analysis laboratory and a conference room.

It was the first private health centre in Pontevedra to have an artificial respirator and to have a CT scan, magnetic resonance or "intelligent" operating rooms.

The hospital has an agreement with the Galician Health Service (Sergas) as an authorised hospital to send patients. This centre receives patients who are victims of work and traffic accidents.

Gallery

References

See also

Related articles 
 Montecelo Hospital
 Pontevedra Provincial Hospital
 University Hospital Complex of Pontevedra

External links 
 Hospital Quirón Pontevedra website

Province of Pontevedra
Hospitals in Spain